Escape from the Shadow Garden – Live 2014 is a live album by the English rock band Magnum, released in 2014 by SPV.

The album was recorded in the spring of 2014 during the band's tour to support the album Escape from the Shadow Garden. The songs on the album came from seven of Magnum's albums. The album became the first live album by Magnum to chart in Germany, peaking at 82.

Track listing

Personnel
 Tony Clarkin — guitar
 Bob Catley — vocals
 Al Barrow — bass guitar
 Mark Stanway — keyboards
 Harry James — drums

References

2015 live albums
Magnum (band) live albums